Laugh to Keep from Crying is an 2009 American stage play created, produced, written and directed by Tyler Perry. The show first opened in the fall of 2009. The play is set at an inner-city building in a predominantly African-American neighborhood. It stars Cheryl Pepsii Riley as Carol, Palmer Williams Jr. as Floyd and Chandra Currelley-Young as Belinda. The live performance released on DVD (August 30, 2011) was recorded live in Atlanta at the Cobb Energy Performing Arts Centre on July 13 - 14, 2010.

Plot
The story revolves around a small group of people living in an inner-city building in a predominantly African-American neighborhood. Carol (Cheryl Pepsii Riley) is a single mother raising two teenagers: Tony (Donny Sykes), who is studious and participates in gospel choir; and Lisa (Tamar Davis), who is rebellious and refuses to attend church. She works long hours during the day, and is best friends with Belinda (Chandra Currelley-Young), their neighbor across the hall. Carol and Belinda disapprove of Niecey (D'Atra Hicks), their upstairs neighbor who is a prostitute. Peter (Wess Morgan) and Anna (Stephanie Ferrett) are a white couple who have moved into the building to save money while Peter attends law school. Anna's recently widowed mother, Jane (Rachel Richards) visits. Floyd (Palmer Williams Jr.) is the superintendent. Carol meets a police officer named Donnie (Anthony Dalton) then Niecy's pimp Eddie, (Celestin Cornielle) who is bad to everybody involved.

Shows

Cast
Cheryl Pepsii Riley as Carol
Chandra Currelley-Young as Belinda
Palmer Williams Jr. as Floyd
D'Atra Hicks as Niecy
Tamar Davis as Lisa
Donny Sykes as Tony
Stephanie Ferrett as Anna 
Chris Cauley as Peter
Wess Morgan (filmed version)
Rachel Richards as Jane
Theo Williamson as Donnie
Anthony Dalton (filmed version)
Greg Stewart as Eddie
Celestin Cornielle (filmed version)

The Band 

 Ronnie Garrett - Musical Director & Bass Guitar
 Derek Scott - Guitar
 Marcus Williams - Drums
 Michael Burton - Saxophone & Keyboards
 Natalie Ragins - Keyboards & Organ
 Lindsay Fields - Background Vocals
 Latayvia Cherry - Background Vocals
 Jeffrey Lewis - Background Vocals
 Zuri Craig - Background Vocals
 Crystal "Chrissy" Collins - Background Vocals

Musical numbers 
All songs written and/or produced by Tyler Perry and Elvin D. Ross.
 "Wake Up Everybody" – Company
 "We Can Work It Out" – Floyd & Niecy
 "You Gave Me Hope" – Peter
 "Lord, I Give It All to You" – Carol
 "Church Medley"
 "I Will Trust in the Lord" – Carol
 "We've Come This Far By Faith" – Tony
 "He Will Fix It" – Belinda & Niecy
 "I Better Get All My Rent" – Floyd
 "Laugh to Keep from Crying" – Belinda
 "Ooh Child" – Company
 "I Need Thee" – Tony
 "No More (I Wanna Be Redeemed)" – Niecy
 "I'm Sorry, So Sorry" – Lisa
 "Block Party Medley"
 "Shame" – Belinda
 "Square Biz" – Anna
 "Best of My Love" – Niecy
 "I'll Take You There" – Jane
 "Outstanding" – Peter
 "Ain't Nobody" – Carol
 "I Like" – Tony
 "I Want You Back" – Lisa

External links

Plays by Tyler Perry
African-American plays
2009 plays